The 2008 Women's Rugby League World Cup was the third staging of the Women's Rugby League World Cup since its inauguration in 2000, and the first since the 2003 tournament. The tournament was held in Australia from 6 November, culminating in the final between Australia and New Zealand on 15 November. It was held at Stockland Park alongside the Police World Cup. Eight teams took part including defending champions New Zealand.

Group stage

Pool A

Pool B

Consolation play-offs

Semi-finals

Seventh place

Fifth place

Third place

Final
The final was held at Suncorp Stadium on 15 November.

References

2008 Rugby League World Cup
Women's Rugby League World Cup
World Cup
Women's rugby league in Australia